The Wildlife Enforcement Monitoring System (WEMS) Initiative, brainchild of environment policy researcher Remi Chandran, is an environmental governance project developed for assisting in monitoring the effectiveness of enforcement and compliance of wildlife law at a national level. The purpose of WEMS initiative is to monitor trafficking and illegal wildlife crime through a joint effort carried out by United Nations bodies, national governments, private industries, civil society and research institutions, by building a common data collection and reporting mechanism at a national level. The project plans to bring together various national institutions to a common information sharing platform and  thereby building the capacity of the states to manage knowledge on wildlife crime trends and threat assessments. The compiled data will be then analyzed and selected non nominal information will be made available online through the WEMS website.  WEMS will also help in providing analysed information electronically to all the national enforcement agencies and international policy makers including Interpol and CITES Secretariat. Selected information will be shared with the public for bringing awareness about wildlife Crime. The WEMS initiative works by bringing together Customs, Police, and Forest (all these agencies belong to different ministries) to a common information sharing mechanism within the national government and this will improve inter agency cooperation in tackling environmental crime holistically. Research and analysis of the crime data will be carried out through a designated national research Institute which will also carry out policy analysis identifying the trends and reasons for non compliance. It will also attempt to analyse the legal decisions on wildlife crimes from data obtained from local courts and will be able to identify weakness in legislation if any. Apart from this, the carriers (example Shipping or Airline company) involved in the illegal trade will also be recorded.

Objectives 
Develop a common information-sharing portal for collection and compilation of violation of wildlife law at a grass root level and sharing the information to policy makers through research and analysis at national and International level.
Strengthening partnership between, government, private and civil society organizations in the implementing region to strengthen information sharing on environmental governance and wildlife crimes such as trafficking and poaching. 
Produce a Global Wildlife Law Enforcement Governance Map depicting the illegal extractions at the range state and, seizures at the destination country with indicators identifying the actions taken by parties to the CITES convention in reducing the loss.
Research on the trends and analysis of transboundary wildlife crime.

Deliverables 
  WEMS IT infrastructure with the following capabilities;
 Report generation (Ecomessage).
 Statistical analysis – Including spatial and non spatial time series analysis.
 Mapping functionalities.
 Simulation model – Spatial model describing transboundary trafficking.
 WEMS user manual and Technical documents.
 WEMS Handbook for training the trainers.
 Wildlife Crime Atlas – Atlas of various species involved and locations of the crime.
 Research Report on the trends of wildlife crime including analysis from the WEMS database.
 WEMS Data Clock – A chart defining the seasons of illegal trade in a calendar year.

Partners 
Lead institutions
United Nations University - Institute for Advanced Studies 
Government
United Nations University - Campus Computing Centre 
ICT for Development
Lusaka Agreement Task Force 
Research institutions
 Center for Geographic Analysis, Harvard University, United States
 Faculty of Geo-Information Science and Earth Observation (ITC),University of Twente, Netherlands 
 Center for International Earth Science Information Network, Earth Institute, Columbia University, United States
 Bond University,  Australia
 United Nations University, Japan
 Remote Sensing Technology Center of Japan, Japan
Industry
Environmental Systems Research Institute (ESRI)

Related work 
Bonn Convention
World Conservation Monitoring Centre

See also
Wildlife conservation
Wildlife management
CITES (Convention on International Trade in Endangered Species of Wild Fauna and Flora)
Environmental agreements

References

 , R., Krishnan, P., & Nguyen, K. (2011). Wildlife Enforcement Monitoring System (WEMS): A solution to support compliance of Multilateral Environmental Agreements. Government Information Quarterly,Volume 28, Issue 2, April 2011, Pages 231-238.
 Dutch technology combats trade in endangered species
 African Wildlife Monitored and Protected
 Boosting CITES -Jacob Phelps, Edward L. Webb, David Bickford, Vincent Nijman and Navjot S. Sodhi (2010), Science Journal
 New UN database to help combat wildlife crime - June 4, 2007, Reuters.
 UN University launches system to combat illegal wildlife trade - Sept. 28, 2006, Japan Times (Kyodo News)
 国際連合大学が野生動物の違法取引監視システムをESRI社のGISを用いて構築
 Will regional monitoring systems help in environmental governance?  A case study on the WEMS model for monitoring enforcement of CITES Convention.

External links

WEMS system 
 WEMS system developed at United Nations University, Campus Computing Centre
 WEMS infrastructure – See United Nations Cloud for the Advancement of the Information Ecosystem in Africa with a Special Focus on Wildlife Enforcement presented by Dr. Ng Chong at Kenya Wildlife Service Headquarters, May 23-25, 2011, Nairobi, Kenya

Animal welfare
International environmental law
Wildlife smuggling